Dexopollenia chrysothrix is a species of cluster fly in the family Polleniidae.

Distribution
Australia.

References

Polleniidae
Taxa named by Mario Bezzi
Insects described in 1927
Diptera of Australasia